"Fa All Y'all" is the second single released from Da Brat's debut album Funkdafied.

Background
"Fa All Y'all" was the follow-up to Da Brat's successful debut single "Funkdafied" which charted at No. 6 on the Billboard Hot 100 and reached platinum status during the summer of 1994. The single was released in September of that year, and although it did not match the success of "Funkdafied", the song nevertheless became Da Brat's second top 40 hit, reaching No. 37 on the Billboard Hot 100, where it spent 12 weeks. The song featured backing vocals from Xscape member Kandi Burruss, as well as Jermaine Dupri, Raven-Symoné and Manuel Seal, Jr. and was written by Da Brat and Dupri and produced by Dupri. The song samples "Heartbreaker" by Zapp.

Music video
The music video was directed by Ken Fox and premiered in late 1994.

Single track listing

G-Rated side
"Fa All Y'All" (G-Rated Extended Club Mix)  4:55
"Fa All Y'All" (G-Rated LP Version)- 3:25
"Fa All Y'All" (G-Rated Remix)- 3:14

R-Rated side
"Fa All Y'All" (R-Rated Remix)- 2:43
"Fa All Y'All" (R-Rated LP Version)- 3:20
"Fa All Y'All" (R-Rated A Cappella)- 3:14

Charts

References

1994 singles
Da Brat songs
Song recordings produced by Jermaine Dupri
Songs written by Jermaine Dupri
Songs written by Da Brat
1994 songs